Rotrou IV (1135-1191), was the Count of Perche. He joined Louis VII of France in a war against Henry II of England, in which he lost lands to the English. Rotrou later went on crusade with Philip II of France and died after the Siege of Acre in 1191.

Biography
Born in 1135, Rotrou was the son of Rotrou III, Count of Perche, and Hawise, daughter of Walter of Salisbury, and Sibilla de Chaworth. 

Upon the death of his father in 1144, Rotrou continued the fight against his archenemy, William III Talvas, Count of Ponthieu and Lord of Alençon. Aside from this long-running blood feud, his uncle Patrick had married William Talvas' daughter Adela. His mother Hawise and her second husband, Robert I of Dreux, served as regents at Perche until he reached the age of maturity.

Rotrou aided Louis VII the Younger against Henry II of England in an ineffective war that saw their troops routed, lands ravaged and property stolen. He was forced to yield the communes of Moulins and Bonsmoulins to the crown England. Nevertheless, a matrimonial alliance with the House of Blois consolidated the declining power of the Counts of Perche.

In 1189,  Rotrou joined Philip II of France and Richard I the Lionheart in the Third Crusade. He died sometime after the Siege of Acre in 1191.

Marriage and issue
In 1160, Rotrou married Matilda of Blois-Champagne, daughter of Theobald II, Count of Champagne, and Matilda of Carinthia.  

Rotrou and Matilda had:
 Geoffrey III, Count of Perche
 Stephen (d. 14 April 1205), Duke of Philadelphia, killed in the Battle of Adrianople 
 Rotrou du Perche (d. 10 December 1201), Bishop of Chalons (1190-1200)
 William II, Count of Perche and Bishop of Chalons
 Beatrix, married Renaud III, lord of Chateau-Gonthier

Rotrou was succeeded as Count of Perche by his son Geoffrey upon his death.

References

Sources 

Counts of Perche
Christians of the Third Crusade
1135 births
1191 deaths